In World War II, the Atlantic pockets were locations along the coasts of the Netherlands, Belgium and France chosen as strongholds by the occupying German forces, to be defended as long as possible against land attack by the Allies. 

"Atlantic strongholds") but are known in English as "Atlantic pockets". 

Six of the Atlantic pockets were captured by the Allies between June and October 1944. Others were placed under siege. Three surrendered in April 1945, and the remainder in May 1945.

Designation as fortresses
On 19 January 1944 Adolf Hitler declared eleven places along the Atlantic Wall to be fortresses (Festungen), to be held until the last man or the last round, calling them  (lit. "Atlantic strongholds").

The ports were: IJmuiden, the Hook of Holland, Dunkirk, Boulogne-sur-Mer, Le Havre, Cherbourg, Saint-Malo, Brest, Lorient, Saint-Nazaire and the Gironde estuary.

In February and March 1944 three more coastal areas were declared to be fortresses: the Channel Islands, Calais and La Rochelle.

Other fortresses were added after D-Day on 6 June 1944 in further directives of 17 August and 4 September.

Purpose
As well as concentrating men and matériel to control the surrounding area, the fortresses' purpose was to deny the use of port facilities to the Allies and to secure their continued use by German submarines in the Battle of the Atlantic. In addition, so long as they remained in German hands, they had propaganda value.

Fate of the pockets
In France, six pockets were captured by the Allies between the initial invasion of Normandy in June 1944, and October 1944, and others brought under siege. Three were liberated by French forces in April 1945, while the remainder surrendered after the capitulation of Germany in May 1945.

List of Atlantic pockets
The Atlantic pockets, with the date any Allied assault began and date the defenders surrendered, are shown below.

See also
 Liberation of France

Notes

References
 Rémy Desquesnes. Les poches de résistance allemandes sur le littoral français: août 1944 – mai 1945. Rennes: Éd. Ouest-France, 2011. ; .
 (fr) 
 
 

Encirclements in World War II
Military installations of the Wehrmacht
Western European Campaign (1944–1945)